"Sing a Song of Freedom" is a song by British singer Cliff Richard, released as a single in October 1971. It peaked at number 13 on the UK Singles Chart.

Release
"Sing a Song of Freedom" was written by songwriting duo Guy Fletcher and Doug Flett and was arranged by and features an orchestral accompaniment by Brian Bennet. In Cliff Richard: The Biography, writer Steve Turner wrote that "Sing a Song of Freedom" "was an all-purpose anthem with no real message which drew upon the popular banner-waving slogans of campus politics". It was, however, banned in South Africa due to the repressive politics there at the time.

It was released as a single with the B-side "A Thousand Conversations", written by Hank Marvin and Bruce Welch, which had been first released by their group Marvin, Welch & Farrar on their debut eponymous album.

Track listing
7": Columbia / DB 8836
 "Sing a Song of Freedom" – 3:24
 "A Thousand Conventions" – 2:18

Personnel
 Cliff Richard – vocals
 Big Jim Sullivan – guitar
 The Breakaways – backing vocals
 Brian Bennett Orchestra – all other instrumentation

Charts

References

Cliff Richard songs
1971 singles
1971 songs
Songs written by Guy Fletcher (songwriter)
Songs written by Doug Flett
Columbia Graphophone Company singles
Song recordings produced by Norrie Paramor
Songs about freedom